An International University Games was an international multi-sport event held between 20–27 August 1939 in Vienna, German Reich (now Vienna, Austria), which had originally been scheduled as the official 1939 staging of the Summer International University Games awarded to Vienna by the Confederation Internationale des Etudiants (CIE) in January 1938, prior to Austria's absorption into Nazi Germany by the Anschluss. The National Socialist German Students' League (NSDStB) withdrew from the CIE in May 1939, and the CIE at short notice moved its version of the 1939 International University Games to Monte Carlo.

The formal opening was by Bernhard Rust, the Reich Minister of Science, Education and Culture, on 20 August in the Prater Stadium, the main venue of the games. The International Institute of Intellectual Cooperation stated in 1940, "The results of the Monaco Games were much superior to those of the Vienna Games."

Participating nations 
The NSDStB invited many nations to the Vienna games, but most entrants were nations affiliated with the Axis powers.  The following countries were reported to have participated in the games:

Athletics

Men's events

Women's events

Medal table

Other sports
Military sports were held at the games, reflecting the militarism of Nazi and fascist states. Other sports included tennis, boxing, field hockey (Germany beat two Italian teams), basketball, swimming, handball, association football, rugby, rowing, fencing, gliding, and water polo (won by Hungary).

Footnotes

References

Sources

Citations

Further reading
 

Athletics at the Summer Universiade
Uni
Sports competitions in Vienna
1930s in Vienna
International athletics competitions hosted by Austria
1939 in Austrian sport
Politics and sports
International sports boycotts
1939 in German sport
Summer World University Games
August 1939 sports events